Operation Sabre (Serbian: Операција Сабља, Operacija Sablja) was a Serbian police operation in 2003 to find and arrest those responsible for the assassination of the prime minister, Zoran Đinđić, as well as other persons who were suspected to have connections to organized crime groups.

Background 
Immediately after the assassination of Đinđić, a state of emergency was declared by interim president, Nataša Mićić, giving the government and police extraordinary powers in the pursuit of the assassins. The state of emergency lasted from the day of the assassination, 12 March 2003, until 22 April 2003.

Action 
The primary goal of the action in Operation Sabre was to find the assassins of Đinđić, but the investigation expanded to other persons who were suspected to have connections to organized crime groups. In the course of Operation Sabre, the police claimed to solve several other high-profile crimes which had been unresolved for years, including the assassination of former Serbian President, Ivan Stambolić.

The members of several organised crime groups were eliminated in the course of Operation Sabre, including the Zemun clan, some of whom were former members of an elite police unit, the Special Operations Unit. Milan Sarajlić, the Deputy State Prosecutor of Serbia, was arrested and confessed to being on the payroll of the Zemun clan.

Criticism 
11,665 people were detained in connection with suspected links to organized crime. Among them were many public figures and entertainers. According to Gow, "The state of emergency period in general, and Operation 'Sabre' in particular, remain controversial in some political circles, and concerns were raised that the Government and the police used the situation to deal with political opponents." Some political opponents accused the government of human rights abuse during the operation but the government and proponents of the action pointed out that the Serbia and Montenegro became a member of the Council of Europe during the action and that the majority of the organizations sent to analyze the situation during the operation including the Organization for Security and Co-operation in Europe declared that the operation was performed without breaches of human rights. Some organisations disagree, notably Human Rights Watch, which was critical of detention in isolation and interrogation without a lawyer being present, and Amnesty International, which alleged ill-treatment and torture.

References

2003 in Serbia
2003 crimes in Serbia
Sabre
Zoran Dindic